InterCity (or, in the earliest days, the hyphenated Inter-City) was introduced by British Rail in 1966 as a brand-name for its long-haul express passenger services (see British Rail brand names for a full history).

In 1986 the British Railways Board divided its operations into a number of sectors (sectorisation). The sector responsible for long-distance express trains assumed the brand-name InterCity, although many routes that were previously operated as InterCity services were assigned to other sectors (e.g. London to King's Lynn services were transferred to the commuter sector Network SouthEast).

InterCity brand

Etymology

The Inter-City train
British Rail first used the term Inter-City in 1950 as the name of a train running between London Paddington and Wolverhampton Low Level. This was part of an overall policy of introducing new train names in the post World War II period.

The name was applied to the business express which ran from London in the morning and returned in the afternoon, and became part of the railway lore of the West Midlands. West Midlands residents always believed that it was the success of this one train that led to the adoption of the name as a British Rail brand in 1966. This belief was supported by the timeline: in 1966 The Inter-City was heading towards its ultimate demise in 1967, when the mainline London-West Midlands service was consolidated into the newly electrified route via Rugby.

InterCity brand
British Rail introduced the Inter-City brand for long haul passenger services in 1966.

Other brand users
The InterCity brand has also been adopted by countries in Europe.

InterCity Company
With sectorisation of British Rail in 1982 most long haul services became consolidated in the InterCity company which retained the brand.  InterCity became profitable and one of Britain's top 150 companies, providing city centre to city centre travel across the nation from Aberdeen and Inverness in the north to Poole and Penzance in the south.

Divisions
InterCity had the following divisions:

 East Coast: Services on the East Coast Main Line from London King's Cross to Yorkshire, North East England and eastern Scotland.
 West Coast: Services on the West Coast Main Line from London Euston to the West Midlands, North Wales, North West England and southern Scotland, including overnight sleeper services to Scotland.
 Midland: Services on the Midland Main Line from London St Pancras to the East Midlands and South Yorkshire.
 Great Western: Services on the Great Western Main Line from London Paddington to South Wales and the West Country, including overnight sleeper services to the West Country.
 Great Eastern: Services on the Great Eastern Main Line from London Liverpool Street to Essex and East Anglia.
 Cross-Country: Services between city pairs that used a combination of the various main lines, but usually avoided Greater London; many of these served the Cross-Country Route.
 Gatwick Express: Shuttle service between London Victoria and Gatwick Airport.

The InterCity sector was also responsible for Motorail services to and from London Kensington Olympia.

Operations
InterCity operated High Speed Trains (HST) under the brand-name InterCity 125, as well as InterCity 225s for the electric high-speed trains operated on the East Coast route.  The "125" referred to the trains' top speed in miles per hour (mph), equivalent to 201 km/h, whereas "225" referred to the intended top speed in km/h (equivalent to 140 mph) and for signalling reasons their actual speed limit was the same 125 mph. InterCity 250 was the name given by InterCity to the proposed upgrade of the West Coast Main Line in the early 1990s.  The existing trains operating on the West Coast were intended to be marketed under the brand InterCity 175, again referring to those trains' top operating speed of 110 mph, roughly equivalent to 175 km/h, although this idea was subsequently dropped.

All InterCity day services ran with a buffet car and the majority ran at speeds of 100 mph or above. If expresses on other sectors are included, there was a period in the early 1990s when British Rail operated more 100 mph services per day than any other country. Special discounted fares, including the Super Advance and the APEX, were available on InterCity if booked ahead.

Rolling stock
HST services were first introduced in 1976 on the Great Western Main Line from London Paddington to Bristol, Cardiff and Swansea.  Formations consisted of 2 first-class, a Restaurant Buffet and 4 standard-class Mark 3 carriages with a Class 43 power car at each end.

East Coast – InterCity 125 HST services started in 1977: Typically 2 first-class, a Restaurant Kitchen, Buffet Standard and 4 standard-class British Rail Mark 3 carriages with a Class 43 power car at each end. These progressively replaced Class 55 "Deltics" which were finally withdrawn in 1981. Later, as catering needs changed, the Restaurant Kitchen was replaced by a fifth standard-class coach. InterCity 225: a Class 91 electric locomotive, nine Mark 4 coaches and a Driving Van Trailer (DVT) operating in push-pull mode; introduced in 1990, with electrification completed in 1991. This saw most of the HSTs transferred to Great Western, Midland and Cross-Country routes, but some remained for the runs to/from Aberdeen, Inverness and Hull.

West Coast – London Euston to Wolverhampton used Class 86 electric locomotives hauling Mark 2 carriages and operated at 100 mph. Euston to Glasgow services used Class 86, Class 87, and Class 90 locomotives hauling Mark 3 coaches and operated at 110 mph. Euston to Holyhead services used Class 47 hauled Mark 2s or HSTs. From 1988, West Coast trains operated in push-pull mode with a DVT at the London end of the train. Before DVTs were introduced, larger fleets of Classes 81–87 were used to haul the trains conventionally. Class 50s operated in pairs north of Preston until electrification was completed in 1974.

Midland – Class 45, 46 and 47 locomotives hauling Mark 1 and Mark 2 carriages. HSTs replaced the loco-hauled trains in the 1980s.

Great Western – InterCity 125s from new, which replaced Class 52s. Other services were also operated by Mark 2 carriages hauled by Class 47s and 50s; later these were transferred to Network SouthEast and replaced by Class 165 DMUs.

Great Eastern – Class 47 diesels hauled Mark 1 and Mark 2 carriages before electrification of the route in the mid-80s. Class 86 electrics were introduced to haul trains from Liverpool Street to Ipswich from 1985, with through electric trains reaching Norwich by 1987. Mark 2 Driving Brake Standard Opens were cascaded from Scotland in the early 90s, so that trains could operate in push-pull mode.  Some routes transferred to Network SouthEast, leaving London-Norwich and the London-Harwich boat-train with InterCity.

Cross Country – Some routes were operated by InterCity 125s, but with only one first class carriage and standard class seats in the buffet car replaced the restaurant. Other routes saw Mark 2 carriages hauled by Class 47 diesel locomotives. Services operating north of Birmingham on the West Coast main line switched to electric traction using Class 86 and Class 90 locomotives. DVTs were not used.

Gatwick Express – Originally used dedicated Class 423 electric multiple units as part of the Southern Region.  Prior to being transferred to InterCity, the service ran from London Victoria calling at Clapham Junction, East Croydon (sometimes via Redhill) and Gatwick Airport running via Haywards Heath to Brighton. The service was transferred to InterCity with Class 73 electro-diesel locomotives (electric third-rail current or diesel-powered) hauling Mark 2 coaches and a modified  driving motor carriage were introduced in 1984 in push-pull mode. When InterCity took over, the service only served London Victoria and Gatwick Airport.

Sleepers – Originally consisted of Mark 2 or Mark 3 seating coaches with Mark 1 sleeper cars. Mark 3 sleeper cars replaced the Mark 1s in the early 1980s. DVTs were not used. The Night Riviera (Paddington-Penzance) was hauled by Class 47s while the Euston-Scotland sleepers were usually hauled by Class 86, 87 or 90 electric locomotives as far as Edinburgh and Glasgow. The sections north of Edinburgh were hauled by Class 37 or 47 diesel locomotives to/from Aberdeen and Inverness, while the section to/from Fort William was hauled by Class 37s.  The London Euston to Stranraer Harbour service worked on the same basis with a change from electric to diesel at Carlisle. The service to Holyhead saw locomotive changes at Crewe.

Fleet details

Train formation
Formations of HST and push–pull train sets would always place the driving van at the London end of the train, then two or three first-class carriages, restaurant and buffet car, and 5 standard-class carriages; the locomotive would always be at the country end of the train. The only exception was the London to Norwich route. As Crown Point depot is to the south of Norwich station, the locomotives worked from the London end as this facilitated easier loco changing at Norwich if necessary. Operating trains in push-pull mode eliminated the requirement to attach locos at terminus stations in order to turn the trains around. This also saved maintenance costs and reduced the number of locomotives and carriages needed to operate the services.

Main destinations
East Coast Main Line:
London Kings Cross,
Stevenage,
Peterborough,
Grantham,
Newark North Gate,
Retford,
Doncaster,
Hull,
Wakefield Westgate,
Leeds,
York,
Northallerton,
Darlington,
Durham,
Middlesbrough,
Newcastle,
Berwick-upon-Tweed,
Dunbar,
Edinburgh,
Glasgow Central,
Dundee,
Perth,
Aberdeen,
Inverness.

West Coast Main Line:
London Euston,
Watford Junction,
Bletchley,
Milton Keynes Central (opened 1982),
Rugby,
Coventry,
Birmingham International,
Birmingham New Street,
Wolverhampton,
Stafford,
Stoke-on-Trent,
Crewe,
Macclesfield,
Wilmslow,
Stockport,
Manchester Piccadilly,
Runcorn,
Liverpool Lime Street,
Chester,
Llandudno Junction,
Bangor,
Holyhead,
Warrington Bank Quay,
Wigan North Western,
Preston,
Lancaster,
Oxenholme,
Carlisle,
Motherwell,
Glasgow Central.

Great Western Main Line:
London Paddington,
Reading,
Didcot Parkway,
Swindon,
Bath Spa,
Bristol Parkway,
Bristol Temple Meads,
Weston-super-Mare,
Newport,
Cardiff Central,
Bridgend,
Port Talbot Parkway,
Neath,
Swansea,
Taunton,
Tiverton Parkway,
Exeter St David's,
Newton Abbot,
Paignton,
Totnes,
Plymouth,
Bodmin Parkway,
St Austell,
Truro,
Penzance.

Midland Main Line:
London St Pancras,
Luton,
Bedford,
Wellingborough,
Kettering,
Market Harborough,
Leicester,
Loughborough,
Nottingham,
Derby,
Chesterfield,
Sheffield,
Leeds,
York,
Scarborough.

Cross Country Route:
Penzance,
Truro,
St Austell,
Plymouth,
Totnes,
Paignton,
Torquay,
Newton Abbot,
Exeter St. David's,
Taunton,
Bristol Temple Meads,
Bristol Parkway,
Cardiff Central,
Newport,
London Paddington,
Poole,
Bournemouth,
Southampton,
Brighton,
Gatwick Airport,
Reading,
Oxford,
Gloucester,
Cheltenham Spa,
Coventry,
Birmingham International,
Birmingham New Street,
Wolverhampton,
Stafford,
Crewe,
Warrington Bank Quay,
Wigan North Western,
Stoke-on-Trent,
Macclesfield,
Stockport,
Manchester Piccadilly,
Manchester Oxford Road,
Bolton,
Hartford,
Runcorn,
Liverpool Lime Street,
St Helens Central,
Preston,
Blackpool North,
Lancaster,
Oxenholme,
Penrith,
Carlisle,
Motherwell,
Glasgow Central,
Derby,
Sheffield,
Doncaster,
Leeds,
York,
Darlington,
Durham,
Newcastle,
Berwick-upon-Tweed,
Edinburgh,
Kirkcaldy,
Dundee,
Arbroath,
Aberdeen.

Great Eastern Main Line:
London Liverpool Street,
Chelmsford,
Colchester,
Manningtree,
Harwich International (for the ferry to Hook of Holland),
Ipswich,
Stowmarket,
Diss,
Norwich.

Gatwick Express:
London Victoria,
Gatwick Airport.

Livery

British Rail introduced a new corporate livery in 1965. The basic blue colour was relieved on long-distance coaches by a light grey panel around the windows. The fronts of locomotives and multiple-unit trains were painted yellow to improve visibility, and this was often wrapped around on to the side in varying amounts. This was therefore the colour scheme used by the new Inter-City services when they were launched the following year. Coaches used on these routes later had a white 'Inter-City' logo added to the blue area near the door at the left end of each side. This was extended to show the purpose of specialist vehicles such as 'Inter-City Sleeper'.

When the production High Speed Train (HST) sets entered service in 1976, they too carried the blue and grey livery. The coaches carried an 'Inter-City 125' logo by the left-hand door. The part of the power car nearest the passenger coaches was also painted blue and grey, but most of the power car was painted yellow with a wide blue panel which lined up with the grey on the coaches. On this blue panel was a large 'Inter-City 125' logo, albeit in outline rather than solid white.

Executive livery
The first production Advanced Passenger Train was unveiled on 7 June 1978. It was painted in a new livery with dark grey upper body and light grey lower body separated by wide white and red bands. The roof was white to reduce solar heating, and a large 'InterCity APT' logotype was positioned on the dark grey section of the power cars – 'InterCity' had no hyphen and was solid white but the 'APT' was an outline. A new 'Executive' service was part of the relaunch of the InterCity Sector on 3 October 1983. This saw the coaches of the Manchester Pullman and two HSTs refurbished and repainted experimentally into the same colour scheme as the APT. The HSTs continued to carry an outline 'InterCity 125' logotype (now with no hyphen) and the large yellow area on the power car that had been a feature of the blue and grey livery. The logotype on coaches was positioned as before but changed to black. By May 1984 other coaches and locomotives were entering service in the dark and light grey livery. 87012 Coeur de Lion entered service with black numbers on the cab side but no logo. 73123 Gatwick Express had white numbers and a large double arrow logo on the dark grey of its bodyside, although the new Gatwick Express service was not operated by the InterCity Sector. In use there were problems with the light colour showing dirt on the diesel HSTs and so dark grey was extended from the roof to cover louvres near the top of the power car body, and the logotype was changed from an outline to solid white to make it more striking. The use of the term 'Executive' was dropped in 1985 and the livery was then referred to as just 'InterCity'.

Swallow livery
A new logotype was introduced on 1 May 1987 as part of InterCity's 21st anniversary celebrations. The colours were unchanged (although locomotives often carried less yellow than before) but locomotives, carriages and advertising received a new logotype. The word INTERCITY was presented in italic, serif upper case letters. A new swallow logo 'to symbolise grace and speed' replaced the double arrow. It was announced that the new branding would appear on 'all InterCity trains that meet high quality standards'. The logotype was omitted from some older locomotives that were otherwise carrying InterCity livery, although some locomotives that predominantly worked in Scotland were given a ScotRail logotype.

Privatisation
During the privatisation of British Rail, InterCity's services were divided up into several franchises. Initial plans were for the train operating companies to co-operate to continue providing a consistent InterCity network, but disagreements meant this did not occur. Great Western Trains registered the term as a British trademark and applied it to its HSTs, but the term fell into disuse before Great Western was bought by FirstGroup in 1998. Occasional services are run using 'Inter-City' branded coaches, usually where additional rolling stock has been hired, but the term is not in official use by train operators. The planned upgrade to many of Britain's former InterCity lines has been termed Intercity Express Programme. The new operators replaced the InterCity branding and liveries with their own branding. One set of Mark 2 carriages remained in InterCity livery until withdrawn by National Express East Anglia in 2005. Several locomotives and carriages have subsequently been repainted into InterCity livery. Virgin CrossCountry repainted 47826 into InterCity livery in December 2001. Some stations on the West Coast Main Line still retain Swallow motifs in 2017. Abellio ScotRail announced that it is to revive the InterCity name on new services operated by refurbished High Speed Train sets, linking the seven cities in Scotland, from mid-2018.

InterCity Railtours
The train operating company Locomotive Services Limited has begun to reuse the InterCity name for its numerous programmes of electric-worked or occasional diesel railtours. An Intercity-liveried set of first-class MK2 coaches, including a matching DVT, is used for the trains. The electric locomotives used for the tours are painted in the matching InterCity paint scheme. Electric locomotives allocated to these trains include British Rail Class 86s, Class 87s & Class 90s. The unique Class 89 No 89001 is planned to be used to haul InterCity trains following the completion of its restoration. Most diesel-worked trains use locos which are not painted in InterCity livery. Although allocated for use on diesel and electric railtours, the coaches have on occasion been hauled by steam locomotives when out on test.

See also
Network SouthEast
Regional Railways
Inter-city rail in the United Kingdom

References

Further reading

British Rail brands
British Rail passenger services
High-speed rail in the United Kingdom
1966 establishments in the United Kingdom
1997 disestablishments in the United Kingdom